The following is a list of Singaporean electoral divisions from 1984 to 1988 that served as constituencies that elected Members of Parliament (MPs) to the 6th Parliament of Singapore in the 1984 Singaporean general elections. The number of seats in Parliament had increased by 4 to 79 seats.

For the first time since the 1968 Singaporean general elections, 2 opposition candidates were elected to Parliament: Chiam See Tong in Potong Pasir, and J. B. Jeyaretnam in Anson.

Constituencies

References

External links
 

1984